The following units and commanders fought in the Battle of Vienna of the Great Turkish War in 1683.

Catholic forces outside the city (until 14 July) 

 Commander-in-Chief: Charles V, Duke of Lorraine

Total - 37,000 men

Catholic forces (14 July - 12 September)

Inside the city 
 Commander-in-Chief: Ernst Rüdiger von Starhemberg
 Generalfeldwachtmeister Wilhelm Johann Anton Graf von Daun
 Generalfeldwachtmeister Karl Ludwig Graf de Souches
 Generalfeldwachtmeister Johann Karl Graf von Serenyi
 Generalfeldwachtmeister Friedrich Siegmund Graf von Schärffenberg
Total - 14,163 men (including city militia)

Field army at Leopoldstadt 

 Commander-in-Chief: Charles V, Duke of Lorraine

Catholic Coalition relief force at the Battle of Kahlenberg 

 Commander-in-chief: King John III Sobieski, King of Poland and Grand Duke of Lithuania

Organization

Imperial troop units 
Total:

 8,100 foot [less Beck]
 12,900 horse
Imperial troops in the campaign, but those not at the battle are not included in the total figures.

Bavarians 
Commander: Generalfeldmarschall-Leutnant Degenfeld

Total of Bavarians (discounting attached Imperial soldiers) - 8,400

Saxons 
General Staff:

 Generalfeldmarschall Freiherr 
 Generalfeldmarschall-Leutnant von Flemming
 Generalwachtmeister von Neitschütz
 Generalwachtmeister Duke 
 Generalwachtmeister von Trauttmannsdorff

Total - 10,454

Reich Troops 
Total:

 7,000 foot
 2,500 horse

Polish 
(A banner is a force of 200 men)

Total:

 estimated at 10,200 foot (20 regiments in 8 brigades)
 14,000 horse

See also

References

Bibliography 

Great Turkish War orders of battle